Alexander Borisovich Zamolodchikov (born September 18, 1952)  is a Russian physicist, known for his contributions to condensed matter physics, two-dimensional conformal field theory, and string theory, and is currently the C.N. Yang/Wei Deng Endowed Chair of Physics at Stony Brook University.

Biography
Born in Novo-Ivankovo, now part of Dubna, Zamolodchikov earned a M.Sc. in Nuclear Engineering (1975) from Moscow Institute of Physics and Technology, a Ph.D. in Physics from the Institute for Theoretical and Experimental Physics (1978). He joined the research staff of Landau Institute for Theoretical Physics (1978) where he got an honorary doctorate (1983).

He co-authored the famous BPZ paper "Infinite Conformal Symmetry in Two-Dimensional Quantum Field Theory", with Alexander Polyakov and Alexander Belavin.

He joined Rutgers University (1990) where he co-founded Rutgers New High Energy Theory Center, and was named Board of Governors Professor (2005).

In 2016, he became the inaugural holder of the C. N. Yang/Wei Deng Chair in the Department of Physics and Astronomy and C. N. Yang Institute for Theoretical Physics at Stony Brook University.

He is the twin brother of the late Alexei Zamolodchikov (1952–2007), also a noted physicist.

Awards
1999: Dannie Heineman Prize for Mathematical Physics with Barry M. McCoy and Tai Tsun Wu for "their groundbreaking and penetrating work on classical statistical mechanics, integrable models and conformal field theories."
2003/4: Humboldt Prize
2005: Blaise Pascal Chair at the École Normale Supérieure in Paris
2011: Lars Onsager Prize, together with Alexander Belavin and Alexander Polyakov, " for the remarkable ideas that they introduced concerning conformal field theory and soluble models of statistical mechanics in two dimensions."
2011: Dirac Medal from the International Center for Theoretical Physics, Trieste.
2016: elected to the National Academy of Sciences

See also
C-theorem
Conformal bootstrap
Knizhnik–Zamolodchikov equations
Thirring model
W-algebra

References

1952 births
Living people
People from Dubna
Russian physicists
21st-century American physicists
American string theorists
Russian string theorists
Moscow Institute of Physics and Technology alumni
Rutgers University faculty
Fellows of the American Physical Society
Mathematical physicists
Fellows of the American Academy of Arts and Sciences
Members of the United States National Academy of Sciences